William G. Merz (April 25, 1878 – March 17, 1946) was an American gymnast and track and field athlete who competed in the 1904 Summer Olympics. He died in Overland, Missouri.

In 1904 he won the silver medal in the rings event and a bronze medal in combined event, in vault event, in pommel horse event and in athletics' triathlon. He was fourth in team event, tenth in all-around competition and 24th in gymnastics' triathlon event.

References

External links
 profile

1878 births
1946 deaths
Olympic gymnasts of the United States
Gymnasts at the 1904 Summer Olympics
Athletes (track and field) at the 1904 Summer Olympics
Olympic silver medalists for the United States in track and field
Olympic bronze medalists for the United States in track and field
American male artistic gymnasts
Olympic medalists in gymnastics
Medalists at the 1904 Summer Olympics
American male triathletes